Thermopsis is a genus of legumes, native to temperate North America and east Asia. They are herbaceous perennials and are known as goldenbanners or false-lupines.

Species
Thermopsis comprises the following species:

 Thermopsis alpina (Pall.) Ledeb.
 Thermopsis alterniflora Regel & Schmalh.

 Thermopsis barbata Benth.
 Thermopsis bargusinensis Czefr.
 Thermopsis californica S. Watson—western North America
 var. argentata (Greene) C.J.Chen & B.L.Turner
 var. californica S. Watson

 Thermopsis chinensis S. Moore
 Thermopsis dahurica Czefr.
 Thermopsis divaricarpa A. Nelson—Rocky Mountains of North America
 Thermopsis dolichocarpa V.A. Nikitin

 Thermopsis fraxinifolia (Torr. & A. Gray) M.A. Curtis—eastern North America

 Thermopsis gracilis Howell—western North America

 Thermopsis gyirongensis S.Q. Wei

 Thermopsis inflata Cambess.
 Thermopsis jacutica Czefr.

 Thermopsis lanceolata R. Br.
 var. glabra (Czefr.) Kurbatski
 var. lanceolata R. Br.

 Thermopsis longicarpa N. Ulziykh.
 Thermopsis lupinoides (L.) Link—Siberia to Japan
 Thermopsis macrophylla Hook. & Arn.—western North America
 Thermopsis mollis (Michx.) A. Gray—eastern North America
 Thermopsis mongolica Czefr.
 Thermopsis montana Torr. & A. Gray—Rocky Mountains of North America
 var. montana Torr. & A. Gray
 var. ovata (Piper) St.John

 Thermopsis przewalskii Czefr.
 Thermopsis rhombifolia (Pursh) Richardson—Rocky Mountains of North America

 Thermopsis robusta Howell—western North America

 Thermopsis schischkinii Czefr.

 Thermopsis smithiana E. Peter

 Thermopsis turkestanica Gand.

 Thermopsis villosa (Walter) Fernald & B.G. Schub.—eastern North America

 Thermopsis yunnanensis (Franch.) P.C. Li
 Thermopsis yushuensis S.Q. Wei

Species names with uncertain taxonomic status
The status of the following species is unresolved:
 Thermopsis corgonensis DC.
 Thermopsis gorgonensis Walp.
 Thermopsis mollis (Michx.) M.A. Curtis & A. Gray
 Thermopsis sauensis C.Y. Yang

References

Sophoreae
Medicinal plants
Fabaceae genera